Vargtimmen Pt. 1: The Inmost Night is the third album by Wyrd, released in 2003 by Solistitium Records.

Vargtimmen is Swedish for "The Hour of the Wolf", Re-released with new artwork in 2005 by Omvina.

Track listing

Credits
Narqath – All music, lyrics, instruments and vocals

References

Wyrd (band) albums
2003 albums